The emerald aphyosemion (Fundulopanchax scheeli) is a species of killifish, endemic to the lower Cross River basin in Nigeria. It is a coastal rainforest fish which lives in small streams and ponds. The specific name honours the Danish count, army colonel, explorer and ichthyologist Jørgen J. Scheel (1916–1989).

References 

scheeli
Endemic fauna of Nigeria
Fish described in 1970